The Matigsalug are an indigenous group who live in the Tigwa-Salug Valley in San Fernando in Bukidnon province, Philippines. "Matigsalug" means "people along the Salug River" (now known as the Davao River). Although often classified under the Manobo ethnolinguistic group, the Matigsalug are a distinct subgroup from the Manobos.

Way of life
The Matigsalug previously practiced a hunting-and-gathering lifestyle with minimal agriculture. Recently, influenced by migrant farmers and traders from the northern Philippines and the island provinces, the Matigsalug shifted to sedentary land cultivation with more or less permanent villages.

Signs of their earlier lifestyle are now found in their cultural and artistic expression, as evidenced by their costumes of bright colored mid-rib blouses and short skirts, and skilled hunting and gathering techniques. This early lifestyle is also depicted in their music, songs, dances, poetry, epic, and spiritual expressions. Matigsalug men wear knee-length tight-fitting pants and turbans decorated with beads and fringed with goat or horse hair.

Language

SIL International has worked in the Matigsalug community for many decades and published a grammatical description of the language. Matigsalug Literacy Education Incorporated operated in the Matigsalug area for many years and won several literacy awards.

References

 National Commission on Indigenous People
 Thinkquest article on Manobos
 Matigsalug Language Christian Association, Inc.

Ethnic groups in Mindanao
Lumad